Mehmet Ashim Dragusha (born 9 October 1977) is an Albanian former professional footballer who played as a midfielder.

Club career
Born in Pristina, Dragusha began his career with local side FC Prishtina. In 1997, he moved to the Slovenian club Maribor before joining German side FC Sachsen Leipzig in 2000. He went on to play for Eintracht Trier and in the Bundesliga for Eintracht Frankfurt. He played 134 matches and scored 12 goals.

International career
Dragusha received the Albanian cititzenship on 6 March 2003 along Lorik Cana. Between 2003 and 2005, he played ten international games with Albania, scoring a single goal.

Personal life
His brother is footballer Alban Dragusha.

Career statistics

References

External links
 
 

1977 births
Living people
Sportspeople from Pristina
Kosovo Albanians
Association football midfielders
Kosovan men's footballers
Kosovo pre-2014 international footballers
Albanian men's footballers
Albania international footballers
Dual internationalists (football)
FC Prishtina players
NK Maribor players
FC Sachsen Leipzig players
SV Eintracht Trier 05 players
Eintracht Frankfurt players
SC Paderborn 07 players
SV Elversberg players
1. FC Magdeburg players
Slovenian PrvaLiga players
2. Bundesliga players
Bundesliga players
Albanian expatriate footballers
Kosovan expatriate footballers
Expatriate footballers in Slovenia
Kosovan expatriate sportspeople in Slovenia
Albanian expatriate sportspeople in Slovenia
Expatriate footballers in Germany
Kosovan expatriate sportspeople in Germany
Albanian expatriate sportspeople in Germany